Odd Fellows Block may refer to:

in the United States
 Odd Fellows Block (Afton, Iowa), listed on the National Register of Historic Places
 Odd Fellows Block (Lewiston, Maine)
 Odd Fellows Block (Grand Forks, North Dakota)

See also
List of Odd Fellows buildings
 Odd Fellows Hall (disambiguation)